Ugonna Anyora  (born 29 April 1991) is a Nigerian footballer midfielder who plays as a midfielder for Enugu Rangers.

Career
Anyora made his debut in Tippeligaen in the 2–0 victory against Vålerenga on 8 August 2010.

Anyora left Haugesund after the 2014 season when his contract expired. After a trial, Anyora signed a two-year contract with Hønefoss BK on 18 February 2015. After just one season, which saw Hønefoss relegated to 2. divisjon, Anyora left the club.

Anyora joined his former club, Enugu Rangers, in January 2018.

Career statistics

References

External links

Ugonna Anyora at Footballdatabase

1991 births
Living people
Nigerian footballers
FK Haugesund players
Eliteserien players
Hønefoss BK players
Norwegian First Division players
Nigerian expatriate footballers
Expatriate footballers in Norway
Nigerian expatriate sportspeople in Norway
Assyriska FF players
Expatriate footballers in Sweden
Nigerian expatriate sportspeople in Sweden
Rangers International F.C. players
Footballers from Enugu
Association football midfielders